Bontang City F.C. is an Indonesian football club based in the Bontang, East Kalimantan, Indonesia. This team currently competes in Liga 3.

Honours
 Liga 3 East Kalimantan
 Champion: 2019
 Runner-up: 2018

References 

2018 establishments in Indonesia
Sport in East Kalimantan
Football clubs in Indonesia
Football clubs in East Kalimantan
Association football clubs established in 2018